Marco Di Costanzo (born 9 June 1992) is an Italian rower. He won the bronze medal in the coxless pair at the 2016 Summer Olympics and in the coxless four at the 2020 Summer Olympics. He also won a gold medal at the 2015 World Rowing Championships an the silver medal at the 2017 World Rowing Championships and at the 2018 World Rowing Championships in the couxless four.

References

External links
 

Italian male rowers
Rowers from Naples
1992 births
Living people
Olympic rowers of Italy
Rowers at the 2016 Summer Olympics
Rowers at the 2020 Summer Olympics
World Rowing Championships medalists for Italy
Medalists at the 2016 Summer Olympics
Medalists at the 2020 Summer Olympics
Olympic bronze medalists for Italy
Olympic medalists in rowing
Mediterranean Games gold medalists for Italy
Mediterranean Games medalists in rowing
Competitors at the 2013 Mediterranean Games
Rowers of Fiamme Oro
21st-century Italian people